The 1994 North Atlantic Conference baseball tournament was held over two weekends, with the final round being played at Friedman Diamond in Brookline, Massachusetts. All eight of the league's teams qualified for the tournament, the format of which was best-of-three quarterfinals and a four-team double-elimination final round. In the championship game, second-seeded Northeastern defeated fifth-seeded Hartford, 5-0, to win its first tournament championship. As a result, Northeastern received the North Atlantic's automatic bid to the 1994 NCAA Tournament.

Seeding 
All eight of the league's teams were seeded one through eight based on conference winning percentage only. They were then matched up for an opening round of four best-of-three series– one vs. eight, two vs. seven, three vs. six, and four vs. five. The four winners of these series met in a double-elimination final round.

Results

All-Tournament Team 
The following players were named to the All-Tournament Team.

Most Outstanding Player 
Northeastern outfielder Bill Barrale was named Most Outstanding Player.

References 

America East Conference Baseball Tournament
1994 North Atlantic Conference baseball season
1994 in sports in Massachusetts
Sports in Brookline, Massachusetts
College baseball tournaments in Massachusetts